The Hornsdale Wind Farm is an electricity generator in the locality of Hornsdale in the south-west of the Narien Range, north of Jamestown, South Australia. The plant is owned and operated by Neoen, a French renewable energy company.

The electricity generated by Hornsdale Wind Farm is contracted to be supplied to the Australian Capital Territory.

Construction
The "Balance of Plant" civil engineering and site works for the wind farm was performed by Catcon for all three stages of construction.  The wind turbine generators were imported from Denmark, and the towers from Vietnam. They were commissioned by Siemens Australia. Before the whole wind farm was commissioned, Hornsdale was generating 86 MW immediately prior to the 2016 South Australian blackout in September 2016.

Operation
The wind farm supplies 1 TWh/year to the 275 kV grid from 3.2 MW direct-drive turbines (no gearbox). The 100 MW Phase 2 tested supplying 6 out of 8 grid services between August 2017 and February 2018.

Artwork
Two of the towers feature paintings by people from the indigenous peoples of the region. Jessica Turner is a Nukunu woman whose artwork represents the story of the serpent's role in forming aspects of the landscape, particularly waterholes. Chris Angrave and Louise Brown are Ngadjuri people who depicted how the Mungiura were found in hilly country, peering over the top of windbreaks before a storm, and blowing hard, which caused a whirly wind.

Hornsdale Power Reserve

The Hornsdale Power Reserve is a grid-connected battery complex co-located with the Hornsdale Wind Farm. It was built by Tesla, Inc. for a cost to Tesla of about US$50 million.

It is owned and operated by Neoen, with the government having the right to call on the stored power under certain circumstances. It provides several services to the grid:
70 MW running for 10 minutes (11.7 MWh) is contracted to the government to provide stability to the grid (grid services) and prevent load-shedding blackouts while other  generators are started in the event of sudden drops in wind or other network issues. This service has reduced the cost of grid services to the Australian Energy Market Operator by 90%.
30 MW for 3 hours (90 MWh) is used by Neoen for load management to store energy when prices are low and sell it when demand is high. 

The battery construction was completed and testing began on 25 November 2017. It was connected to the grid on 1 December 2017.  This easily beat Elon Musk's wager of "100 days from contract signature", which started when a grid connection agreement was signed with ElectraNet on 29 September 2017.  Tesla had already begun construction, and some units were already operational by the time the contract was signed. Due to the project's success and the area's demand for stable electricity output, the project was expanded by 50% in November 2019. The upgraded system is capable of discharge at  into the power grid.

References

External links
 Current wind conditions

Wind farms in South Australia